Christian Tallman (born September 22, 1970) is an American actor and comedian best known for his regular appearances on the Comedy Central programs Crossballs and Reno 911!. Tallman was also the creator of the popular Channel 101 series Time Belt which he wrote, directed, co-produced and starred in. He has also guest-starred on many television shows such as House, Parks and Recreation, Emily's Reasons Why Not, Angel, How I Met Your Mother, The Sarah Silverman Show, The King of Queens, and appeared on Frank TV as Ed McMahon. In October 2013,  The Thundermans began airing on Nickelodeon. It featured Tallman as Hank Thunderman, a superhero father, with powers such as flying and super-strength. Currently he appears weekly on the Dungeons and Dragons tabletop roleplaying game podcast, Nerd Poker.

Tallman is from Madison, Wisconsin, where he attended Madison West High School. He performed with a number of theater groups in Madison, as well as being a long-standing member of the Madison chapter of ComedySportz and is currently on the roster of ComedySportz Los Angeles.

In 2007, Tallman was part of the ensemble cast of NBC's improvised comedy show Thank God You're Here, which showcased the improvisational skills of a group of four celebrity guest stars each week, as they walk into a live sketch without having seen a script for it.
He was awarded the Channel 101 Lifetime Achievement Award at the 2007 Channel 101 Channy Awards.

Filmography

References

External links 

1970 births
Living people
21st-century American comedians
21st-century American male actors
Actors from Madison, Wisconsin
American male comedians
American male film actors
American male television actors
American male television writers
American television writers
Madison West High School alumni
Male actors from Wisconsin